Marek Biro (born February 8, 1988) is a Slovak professional ice hockey defenceman currently playing for GKS Tychy of the Polska Hokej Liga.

Career
Biro played junior hockey in the Ontario Hockey League for two seasons for the Windsor Spitfires, who drafted him 18th overall in the 2006 CHL Import Draft. In 2008, he made his Tipsport Liga debut with his hometown team HC Banská Bystrica where he played for three seasons until 2011

Biro then had spells with HC Košice and HK Dukla Trenčín before rejoining Banská Bystrica. He then spent the 2013–14 season with ŠHK 37 Piešťany before returning to Banská Bystrica once more the following season.

On May 17, 2015, Biro joined Orli Znojmo of the Erste Bank Eishockey Liga. He then made another return to Banská Bystrica on May 22, 2018.

References

External links

1988 births
Living people
HC '05 Banská Bystrica players
HK Dukla Trenčín players
HC Košice players
Orli Znojmo players
ŠHK 37 Piešťany players
Slovak ice hockey defencemen
Sportspeople from Banská Bystrica
Windsor Spitfires players
Slovak expatriate ice hockey players in Canada
Slovak expatriate ice hockey players in the Czech Republic
Slovak expatriate sportspeople in Poland
Expatriate ice hockey players in Poland